Maine-et-Loire is a department in the Loire Valley in the Pays de la Loire region in Western France. It is named after the two rivers, Maine and the Loire. It borders Mayenne and Sarthe to the north, Loire-Atlantique to the west, Indre-et-Loire to the east, Vienne and Deux-Sèvres to the south, Vendée to the south-west, and Ille-et-Vilaine to the north-west. It also borders Ille-et-Vilaine in the north for just , France's shortest department boundary. Its prefecture is Angers; its subprefectures are Cholet, Saumur and Segré-en-Anjou Bleu. Maine-et-Loire had a population of 818,273 in 2019.

History 

Maine-et-Loire is one of the original 83 departments created during the French Revolution on 4 March 1790, mostly out of the southern portion of the former province of Anjou. Originally it was called Mayenne-et-Loire, but its name was changed to Maine-et-Loire in 1791. Its present name is drawn from the rivers Maine and Loire, which meet within the department.

Geography 
Maine-et-Loire is part of the current region of Pays de la Loire. The principal city is Angers, the seat of a bishopric and of a court of appeal.

It has a varied landscape, with forested ranges of hills in the south and north separated by the valley of the Loire. Part of the Loire Valley UNESCO World Heritage Site lies in Maine-et-Loire.

The area has many navigable rivers such as the Loire, Sarthe, Mayenne, Loir, and Authion.

Principal towns

The most populous commune is Angers, the prefecture. As of 2019, there are 6 communes with more than 20,000 inhabitants:

Demographics 
The inhabitants of Maine-et-Loire have no official qualifier. They are sometimes known as Angevins, from the former province of Anjou, or Mainéligériens, from the name of the department.

Population development since 1801:

Politics

The president of the Departmental Council is Florence Dabin, elected in July 2021.

Current National Assembly Representatives

Tourism
Châteaux of the Loire Valley 
 Château de Montsoreau.
 Royal Abbey of Fontevraud.
 Château de Brissac.
 Château de Saumur.
 Château d'Angers.
 Château de Brézé.
Anjou traditions
 The largest vineyard of the Loire Valley.
 The boule de fort, the traditional boules game in Anjou

Angers and around:
 The Angers castle and the Apocalypse Tapestry, the largest tapestry in the world.
 The Cointreau museum, in Saint-Barthélemy-d'Anjou
 The Château de Brissac, the tallest castle of the Loire Valley.
 The crooked spires in Baugé region.

Saumur and around:
 The Cadre Noir, one of the most famous horsemanship school in the world.
 Montsoreau Flea Market is the largest Flea Market in the Loire Valley taking place every second Sunday of the month.
 Château de Montsoreau-Museum of contemporary art, featuring the Philippe Méaille Collection, largest collection of works by the British conceptual artists, Art & Language.
 The Royal Abbey of Fontevraud and the graves of the House of Plantagenet, including Richard I of England.
 The Tank museum of Saumur, which display the largest tank collection in France.
 Around Saumur, the largest concentration of troglodyte house in Europe.

Cholet and around:
 The textile museum of Cholet, and the creation of the famous red and white handkerchief.
 The Château de Touvois
 The Parc Oriental de Maulévrier, the largest Japanese garden of France

Segré and around:
 The fortified city of Pouancé and its medieval castle.
 The Blue Mine, a slate mine, with a funicular which goes 130 meters under the surface.
 The National stud of Le Lion-d'Angers, which host every year Le Mondial du Lion
 The Château de Challain-la-Potherie

See also
Cantons of the Maine-et-Loire department
Communes of the Maine-et-Loire department
Arrondissements of the Maine-et-Loire department
Anjou wine

References

External links

  Prefecture website
  Departmental Council website
  Anjou Tourism Board website
 

 
1790 establishments in France
Departments of Pays de la Loire
States and territories established in 1790